Church Ground is a village on the island of Nevis in Saint Kitts and Nevis. It is the capital of the Saint John Figtree Parish.

Populated places in Saint Kitts and Nevis